Gretar Tryggvason is Department Head of Mechanical Engineering and Charles A. Miller Jr. Distinguished Professor at Johns Hopkins University. He is known for developing the front tracking method to simulate multiphase flows and free surface flows. Tryggvason was the editor-in-chief of Journal of Computational Physics from 2002–2015.

Area of research
Tryggvason has been a leading worker computational fluid dynamics and numerical methods. He is well known for his research on numerical simulations of vortex flows, multiphase flows, free surface flows, and flows with phase changes. For simulating multiphase flows, he and his co-workers have developed a front tracking method that incorporates an unstructured, moving grid within an underlying Eulerian grid.

Education
Ph.D. – Brown University, Division of Engineering, 1985
Sc.M. – Brown University, Division of Engineering, 1982
B.S. – University of Iceland, Mechanical Engineering, 1980

Professional experience
 2017–Present: Charles A. Miller Jr. Distinguished Professor and Head, Department of Mechanical Engineering, Johns Hopkins University, Baltimore, MD
 2011 - 2017: Chair, Department of Aerospace and Mechanical Engineering, University of Notre Dame, IN 
 2010 - 2017: Viola D. Hank Professor of Aerospace and Mechanical Engineering, University of Notre Dame, IN
 2016: Visiting professor, University of Paris VI, France, 6/13-7/9
 2000 - 2010: Professor and head, Department of Mechanical Engineering. Worcester Polytechnic Institute, MA
 1999: Visiting scientist, University of Paris VI, France, 4/19-5/8
 1998: Visiting professor, Institut Universitaire des Systèmes Thermiques Industriels (IUSTI), University of Aix-Marseille, France, 4/15-5/15
 1994: Visiting research associate, Caltech, 1/1-5/31 (sabbatical)
 1993 - 1997: Associate chairman, Department of Mechanical Engineering and Applied Mechanics. University of Michigan, Ann Arbor
 1991 - 1996: Visiting research position, Institute for Computational Mechanics in Propulsion, NASA Lewis Research Center, every summer.
 1985 - 2000: Professor of Mechanical Engineering and Applied Mechanics. University of Michigan, Ann Arbor. (assistant professor, 1985–1991; associate professor, 1991–1997; professor, 1997 2000)
 1984 - 1985: Associate research scientist, Courant Institute of Mathematical Sciences, New York University.

Awards, honors, societies and journal editorships

Honors and awards 
 2019: Thermal Fluids Engineering Award from the American Society of Thermal and Fluids Engineering (ASTFE)
 2014: Outstanding Paper Award. Journal of Chemical Engineering of Japan
 2013: Elected Fellow of the American Association for the Advancement of Science
 2012: ASME Fluids Engineering Award
 2006: WPI Sigma Xi Outstanding Senior Faculty Research Award
 2005: The 2005 Computational Mechanics Award from the Computational Mechanics Division of the Japan Society of Mechanical Engineers (JSME)
 2005: Elected Fellow of the American Society of Mechanical Engineers
 2000: Elected Fellow of the American Physical Society (Division of Fluid Dynamics)
 2000: College Award for Service, University of Michigan
 1997: Best Paper Award. ASEE Annual meeting (with D. Tilbury and S.L. Ceccio)
 1996: Departmental Award for Service, University of Michigan
 1991: Departmental Award for Research, University of Michigan
 1983: Predoctoral Geophysical Fluid Dynamics Fellow, Woods Hole Oceanographic Institution
 1980, 1981, and 1983: Brown University Fellowships
 1980: Thor Thors Special Contribution Award (The American-Scandinavian Foundation)
 1980: Fulbright travel grant

Societies 

 American Society of Thermal and Fluids Engineers, member 2019
 American Nuclear Society, member 2013
 American Society of Engineering Education, member 1998
 American Society of Mechanical Engineers, member 1991. Elected Fellow 2005
 American Association for the Advancement of Sciences, member 1988. Elected Fellow 2013
 Association of Chartered Engineers in Iceland, member 1987–1992
 Society for Industrial and Applied Mathematics, member
 Sigma Xi, member 1982
 American Physical Society, member 1982. Elected Fellow 2000

Journal editorships 
 2011–Present: Editorial advisory board, International Journal of Multiphase Flow
 2009–Present: Editorial board, Scientia Iranica, Transaction B: Mechanical Engineering
 2006–Present: Associate editor, Journal of Applied Fluid Mechanics
 2002 - 2015: Editor-in-chief, Journal of Computational Physics
 2002 - 2009: Associate editor, International Journal of Multiphase Flow
 1992 - 2002: Associate editor, Journal of Computational Physics

Selected journal publications

 H. Xia, J. Lu, and G. Tryggvason. “A Numerical Study of the Effect of Viscoelastic Stresses in Fused Filament Fabrication“ Computer Methods in Applied Mechanics and Engineering. 346 (2019), 242–259.
 J. Lu and G. Tryggvason. “Direct numerical simulations of multifluid flows in a vertical channel undergoing topology changes“ Physical Review Fluids. 3 (2018), 084401. 
 M. Ma, J. Lu, and G. Tryggvason. “Using statistical learning to close two-fluid multiphase flow equations for bubbly flows in vertical channels“ Int’l. J. of Multiphase Flow. 85 (2016) 336–347. 
 S. Dabiri and G. Tryggvason. “Heat transfer in turbulent bubbly flow in vertical channels“ Chemical Engineering Science. 122 (2015), 106–113.
 M. Ma, J. Lu, and G. Tryggvason. “Using Statistical Learning to Close Two-Fluid Multiphase Flow Equations for a Simple Bubbly System“ Phys. Fluids, 27 (2015) 092101.
 B. Aboulhasanzadeh, S. Thomas, M. Taeibi-Rahni, and G. Tryggvason. “Multiscale computations of mass transfer from buoyant bubbles“ Chemical Engineering Science 75 (2012) 456–467.
 S. Thomas, A. Esmaeeli and G. Tryggvason. “Multiscale computations of thin films in multiphase flows“ Int’l J. Multiphase Flow 36 (2010), 71–77. 
 H. Terashima and G. Tryggvason. “A front-tracking/ghost fluid method for fluid interfaces in compressible flows“ J. Comput. Phys. 228 (2009) 4012–4037.
 J. Lu and G. Tryggvason. “Effect of Bubble Deformability in Turbulent Bubbly Upflow in a Vertical Channel“ Phys. Fluids. 20 (2008), 040701  
 M. Muradoglu and G. Tryggvason. “A front-tracking method for computation of interfacial flows with soluble surfactants“ J. Comput. Phys. 227 (2008), 2238–2262.
 J. Lu, A. Fernandez, and G. Tryggvason. “The effect of bubbles on the wall shear in a turbulent channel flow“ Phys. Fluids 17 (2005), 095102 
 A. Koynov, G. Tryggvason, and J. G. Khinast. “Mass Transfer and Chemical Reactions in Bubble Swarms with Dynamic Interfaces“ AIChE Journal 10 (2005), 2786–2800.
 A. Fernandez, J. Che, S.L. Ceccio, and G. Tryggvason. “The Effects of Electrostatic Forces on the distribution of Drops in a Channel Flow—Two-Dimensional Oblate Drops“ Phys. Fluids 17 (2005), 093302 
 A. Esmaeeli and G. Tryggvason. “Computations of Film Boiling. Part I: Numerical Method“ Int’l. J. of Heat and Mass Transfer 47 (2004), 5451–5461.
 S. Nas and G. Tryggvason. “Thermocapillary interaction of two bubbles or drops“ Int’l J. Multiphase Flows 29 (2003), 1117–1135.
 N. Al-Rawahi and G. Tryggvason. “Computations of the growth of dendrites in the presence of flow. Part I-Two-dimensional Flow“ J. Comput. Phys. 180 (2002), 471–496. 
 B. Bunner and G. Tryggvason. “Dynamics of Homogeneous Bubbly Flows: Part 1. Rise Velocity and Microstructure of the Bubbles“ J. Fluid Mech. 466 (2002), 17–52.
 G. Tryggvason, M. Thouless, D. Dutta, S. L. Ceccio, and D. M. Tilbury. “The New Mechanical Engineering Curriculum at the University of Michigan“ J. Engineering Education 90 (2001), 437–444. 
 G. Tryggvason, B. Bunner, A. Esmaeeli, D. Juric, N. Al-Rawahi, W. Tauber, J. Han, S. Nas, and Y.-J. Jan. “A Front Tracking Method for the Computations of Multiphase Flow“ J. Comput. Physics 169 (2001), 708–759.
 S. Mortazavi and G. Tryggvason. “A numerical study of the motion of drops in Poiseuille flow. Part 1. Lateral migration of one drop“ J. Fluid Mech. 411 (2000), 325–350.
 J. Han and G. Tryggvason. “Secondary Breakup of Liquid Drops in Axisymmetric Geometry—Part I, Constant Acceleration“ Phys. Fluids 11 (1999), 3650–3667.
 M. Jaeger, M. Carin, M. Medale, and G. Tryggvason. “The Osmotic Migration of Cells in a Solute Gradient“ Biophysical Journal 77 (1999), 1257–1267.
 G. Agresar, J.J. Linderman, G. Tryggvason, and K.G. Powell. “An Adaptive, Cartesian, Front-Tracking Method for the Motion, Deformation and Adhesion of Circulating Cells“ J. Comput. Phys 143 (1998), 346–380.
 D. Juric and G. Tryggvason. “Computations of Boiling Flows“ Int’l. J. Multiphase Flow. 24 (1998), 387–410.
 A. Esmaeeli and G. Tryggvason. “Direct Numerical Simulations of Bubbly Flows. Part I—Low Reynolds Number Arrays“ J. Fluid Mech. 377 (1998), 313–345.
 E.A. Ervin and G. Tryggvason. “The Rise of Bubbles in a Vertical Shear Flow“ ASME J. Fluid Engineering 119 (1997), 443–449.
 D. Juric and G. Tryggvason. “A Front Tracking Method for Dendritic Solidification“ J.  Comput. Phys. 123 (1996), 127–148.
 M.R. Nobari, Y.-J. Jan and G. Tryggvason. “Head-on Collision of Drops--A Numerical Investigation“ Phys. Fluids 8 (1996), 29–42.
 S.O. Unverdi, G. Tryggvason. “A Front Tracking Method for Viscous Incompressible Flows“ J. Comput. Phys. 100 (1992), 25–37.
 G. Tryggvason. “Numerical Simulation of the Rayleigh-Taylor Instability“ J. Comput. Phys, 75 (1988), 253–282.
 G. Tryggvason and H. Aref. “Numerical Experiments on Hele Shaw Flow with a Sharp Interface“ J. Fluid Mech., 136 (1983), 1-30.

Books

 A. Prosperetti and G. Tryggvason (editors and main contributors). Computational Methods for Multiphase Flow. Cambridge University Press, 2007. Paperback edition 2009.
 G. Tryggvason, R. Scardovelli and S. Zaleski. Direct Numerical Simulations of Gas-Liquid Multiphase Flows. Cambridge University Press. 2011.
 G. Tryggvason and D. Apelian (editors and contributors). Shaping Our World: Engineering Education for the 21st Century. John Wiley and Sons, Inc., 2011

References

External links
Bio - University of Notre Dame
Worcester Polytechnic Institute
Profile at ACM Portal

Fluid dynamicists
Computational fluid dynamicists
Living people
Icelandic emigrants to the United States
Brown University School of Engineering alumni
Johns Hopkins University faculty
21st-century American engineers
Fellows of the American Society of Mechanical Engineers
Fellows of the American Physical Society
Fellows of the American Association for the Advancement of Science
1956 births
University of Michigan faculty